The 2016 Currie Cup Premier Division was the top tier of the second stage of the 2016 Currie Cup, the 78th edition of this annual South African rugby union competition organised by the South African Rugby Union. It was played between 5 August and 22 October 2016 and featured nine teams that qualified through the 2016 Currie Cup qualification competition.

Competition rules and information

There are nine participating teams in the 2016 Currie Cup Premier Division.

Qualification

The six franchise teams automatically qualified for the 2016 Currie Cup Premier Division, and were joined by the three highest-placed non-franchise teams from the 2016 Currie Cup qualification stage. Points will not be carried over to the Premier Division.

Regular season and title playoffs

The nine teams that qualified for the Premier Division will play against each other over the course of the competition, either at home or away. Teams will receive four points for a win and two points for a draw. Bonus points will be awarded to teams that score four or more tries in a game, as well as to teams that lose a match by seven points or less. Teams will be ranked by log points, then points difference (points scored less points conceded).

The top four teams will qualify for the semifinals, which will be followed by a final.

Relegation

In March 2017, the South African Rugby Union decided to reduce the competition to seven teams for 2017 Currie Cup Premier Division.

Teams

The teams that qualified for the 2016 Currie Cup Premier Division are:

Team Listing

Standings
The final log for the 2016 Currie Cup Premier Division was:

Round-by-round

The table below shows a team's progression throughout the season. For each round, each team's cumulative points total is shown with the overall log position in brackets.

Matches

The following matches were played in the 2016 Currie Cup Premier Division:

Round one

The 2016 Currie Cup Premier Division got off to a turbulent start after the  reached the 2016 Super Rugby final and requested that the  be given a bye in Round One of the competition. They were reformed with the help of their local municipal council, but with no coaches or players in place, their Round One match against  was also postponed. On the field, the action got underway in Pretoria, where the  beat 2015 losing finalists  45–26. They scored six tries, with Tian Schoeman kicking 15 points, while Western Province responded with four tries, all in the final twenty minutes of the match. In the other match played on the Friday evening, the  beat the  33–10 in Nelspruit, outscoring the hosts by five tries to one. The biggest victory of the weekend came in the Saturday match, with the  beating  44–16 in Wellington, also scoring five tries to one to go top of the log. Fred Zeilinga scored nineteen points in that match, the most by any player in Round One.

Round two

The Golden Lions won the match 68–26 to move into third position on the log, scoring ten tries in the process, of which winger Anthony Volmink scored two.

Round three

In the other match, the  lost their first match since the 2014 Currie Cup Final, with Kimberley-based side  beating them 30–24.

Round four

Griquas centre Clinton Swart matched Bosch's 21 points in the match, eclipsing Pumas fly-half Francois Brummer's 15 points, while Rudi van Rooyen scored two tries for the visitors. In the other match of the round,  moved up to sixth place after beating bottom side  36–6, with Huw Jones getting a hat-trick of tries for the team from Cape Town.

Round One (rescheduled)

A midweek match saw  secure their third consecutive victory in the competition to move into third position on the log, while cementing the ' last place. Griquas also picked up a bonus point by virtue of scoring seven tries, with fullback AJ Coertzen getting two.

Round Five

Curwin Bosch was again the Sharks' main points contributor with 18 points through five penalties and converting one of the Sharks' two tries, but Western Province secured the victory after scoring five tries, with outside centre EW Viljoen scoring two in his first start of the season. The  made it four wins out of four with a 57–25 win over a  team that played their third match in a week, to move to within a single log point of the Sharks, with Nico Lee, Charles Marais and Paul Schoeman each scoring two of the Cheetahs' nine tries.

Round Six

The  moved into top spot on the log after beating the  38–30 in a top-of-the-log clash in Durban. They scored five tries, with Fred Zeilinga successfully converting them all, while 20 points from the boot of Curwin Bosch was not enough for the Sharks, who dropped to second place. The  remained two points behind Griquas after beating  58–32 in the most high-scoring match of the round. They scored eight tries (with Kwagga Smith scoring two) and Jaco van der Walt kicked 18 points, while Jacques Vermeulen scored two tries for Western Province.

Round Seven

The  became the first team to secure a semi-final berth after winning their sixth consecutive match, beating the  37–29 in Bloemfontein. The Cheetahs had different try scorers for all five of their tries, while the Golden Lions relied on the boot of Jaco van der Walt, who kicked 16 of his side's points. After two consecutive defeats, the  returned to winning ways, securing the first whitewash of the season after beating bottom side  53–0, scoring nine tries in the match. The  remained level on log points with the Sharks after scoring a half-century of their own, beating  57–20 in Pretoria. Piet van Zyl scored two if his side's eight tries, while Tian Schoeman kicked 17 points. While Griquas remained in the final semi-final position despite the defeat, fifth-placed  closed the gap by beating the  31–23 in Cape Town.

Round Eight

Rayno Benjamin scored a hat-trick of tries in the match with Paul Schoeman getting a brace, as the Cheetahs ensured that they would top the log and have home advantage in the semifinal and possible final. Hanro Liebenberg scored two of the Blue Bulls' seven tries in their final match of the regular season, while Theuns Kotzé also scored two tries for the home side. Golden Lions captain Kwagga Smith scored a hat-trick, with Howard Mnisi and Jacques Nel each contributing two of the Lions' eleven tries.  also won their match against  in Kimberley, meaning all four fixtures resulted in away wins. Six different try scorers and 22 points kicked by Robert du Preez saw Western Province move into the top four, behind a  team that enjoyed a bye weekend, while Griquas dropped to sixth place despite picking up a bonus point for scoring four tries of their own.

Round Nine

In the first match of the weekend, defending champions the  secured a place in the semifinals after beating the  28–16 in Johannesburg. Boland ran in four tries to lead 28–20 with 8 minutes to go, but Western Province scored a converted try and a 78th–minute penalty through fly-half Robert du Preez to secure the final semi-final spot in dramatic fashion, winning the match 30–28. The Pumas edged the match 38–30, with hooker Frank Herne scoring a hat-trick of tries in his team's only win of the season. The final group match in the competition was a dead rubber; top side  outscored  by 9 tries to 4 to win 63–26; scrum-half Shaun Venter got a brace, while fly-half Niel Marais contributed 17 points through one try and 6 conversions.

Semi-finals

Final

The  beat the  36–16 to win the Currie Cup for the fifth time in their history and for the first time since 2007. The first half delivered no tries, with Free State Cheetahs fly-half Niel Marais kicking six penalties against Blue Bulls fly-half Tian Schoeman's three penalties for an 18–9 half-time lead. A converted Clayton Blommetjies try and two more penalties extended the Free State Cheetahs' lead to 31–9 by the 67th minute. A Piet van Zyl try in the 74th minute briefly gave the Blue Bulls some hope, but the Free State Cheetahs responded with a try of their own through Sergeal Petersen just two minutes later to put the result beyond any doubt. Niel Marais contributed 21 points for the home side by kicking seven penalties; a new Currie Cup final record, surpassing the six penalties scored by Thierry Lacroix in the 1995 final and by Patrick Lambie in the 2012 final.

Honours

The honour roll for the 2016 Currie Cup Premier Division was:

Players

Squads

The following squads were named for the 2016 Currie Cup Premier Division:

Appearances and points

For each team, (c) denotes the team captain. For each match, the player's squad number is shown. Starting players are numbered 1 to 15, while the replacements are numbered 16 to 22. "App" refers to the number of appearances made by the player, "Try" to the number of tries scored by the player, "Kck" to the number of points scored via kicks (conversions, penalties or drop goals) and "Pts" refer to the total number of points scored by the player.

Points scorers

The following table contain points scored in the 2016 Currie Cup Premier Division:

Discipline

The following table contains all the cards handed out during the tournament:

Referees

The following referees officiated matches in the 2016 Currie Cup Premier Division:

See also

 2016 Currie Cup First Division
 2016 Currie Cup qualification
 2016 Under-21 Provincial Championship
 2016 Under-20 Provincial Championship
 2016 Under-19 Provincial Championship

Notes

References

 
2016
2016 in South African rugby union
2016 rugby union tournaments for clubs